The Devil Take Her is an opera in one act by Arthur Benjamin to an original English libretto by Alan Collard and John Gordon.  Its first performance was Royal College of Music, London, 1931. Its first American performance was in New York in 1941.

The opera is set in 15th century London. A man is married to a woman who has not been able to speak since birth. A surgeon arrives who gives her the ability to speak, but once the wife can speak she becomes bad tempered and domineering. Exasperated the husband calls for the Devil to take her, but when the Devil arrives he too cannot bear the wife. The opera ends with the husband and devil escaping together from the wife.

Sources 
The Devil Take Her on Boosey & Hawkes

References

English-language operas
Operas by Arthur Benjamin
Operas
One-act operas
1931 operas